The Battle of Njinjo was fought during the East African Campaign of World War I.

References

Battles of the East African Campaign